Dattak (The Adopted) is a 2001 Hindi film directed by Gul Bahar Singh with Rajit Kapoor, Anjan Srivastav and A.K. Hangal in the lead roles. The film was in competition in the 5th Shanghai International film festival, China and also screened at 20th Fazr International film festival, Tehran (Iran).it was recently shown in IFFI, Goa too.

Plot 
Sunil is married to an American girl. His father lives in Kolkata with an old servant Shambhu. When Sunil returns home after fifteen years he sees the house is locked and his father has disappeared. Guilt-ridden Sunil starts looking for him. He learns that his father might be in an old age home. He reaches there only to find that he had died a few months earlier. Sunil meets Satya Babu, his father's fellow inmate, who tells him all about his father's last days. Sunil tells the old man that he wants to adopt him as his father and requests him to come to US with him.

Cast

References

External links 
 

2001 films
2000s Hindi-language films